Zelyony Klin is a rural locality (a village) and the administrative center of Zelenoklinovsky Selsoviet, Alsheyevsky District, Bashkortostan, Russia. The population was 378 as of 2010. There are 7 streets.

Geography 
Zelyony Klin is located 41 km southeast of Rayevsky (the district's administrative centre) by road. Novokonstantinovka is the nearest rural locality.

References 

Rural localities in Alsheyevsky District